Isyu ug Istorya is a Philippine television documentary show broadcast by GMA Network in the Mindanao region. Hosted by John Paul Seniel, it premiered on July 19, 2014. The show concluded on February 28, 2015 with a total of 31 episodes. It served as a spin-off of Isyu Mindanao.

Synopsis
The program was primarily and exclusively tackle issues on Mindanao as they look back the biggest stories and features in all of Mindanao-based programs of GMA Network. Essentially something that made every Mindanao people not only aware of what is happening but also proud of what they have or what they are.

The program encouraged the viewers to be storytellers and chroniclers in which they achieve lasting and sustainable peace, understanding and progress aided by the stories from Mindanao.

Anchors
John Paul Seniel

Reporters
LJ Lindaan
Jennifer Solis
Leigh Fortich

Simulcasting areas
Iligan
Ozamiz
Bukidnon
Dipolog
Pagadian
Kidapawan
Cotabato

References 

GMA Network original programming
GMA Integrated News and Public Affairs shows
Philippine documentary television series
2014 Philippine television series debuts
2015 Philippine television series endings